Fredericton (formerly Fredericton—York—Sunbury) is a federal electoral district in New Brunswick, Canada, that has been represented in the House of Commons of Canada since 1988. Its population in 2021 was  87,436. Its predecessor riding, York—Sunbury, was represented in the House of Commons from 1917 to 1988.

The district includes the city of Fredericton, and the towns of Oromocto, and Minto and vicinity.

The neighbouring ridings are Miramichi, Beauséjour, Fundy Royal, New Brunswick Southwest, and Tobique—Mactaquac.

Political geography

"York—Sunbury" riding was created in 1914 from parts of Sunbury—Queen's and York ridings. Previously, York County was its own riding and Sunbury County was joined with Queens County.

The riding was named after York and Sunbury counties of which it was composed.

In 1987, York—Sunbury was abolished. Some rural areas in the southern parts of the riding were transferred to Carleton—Charlotte riding, and a largely uninhabited area, moved to Miramichi. The remainder was incorporated into "Fredericton" riding. It was renamed "Fredericton—York—Sunbury" shortly after the 1988 election.

Fredericton-York-Sudbury was abolished in 1996 when more rural areas were moved into other districts (particularly Tobique—Mactaquac and New Brunswick Southwest, and a new riding named "Fredericton" was created. The Minto and Chipman areas were added to the riding in 2003. As per the 2012 federal electoral redistribution, this riding will lost territory to Miramichi—Grand Lake, New Brunswick Southwest and Tobique—Mactaquac, and gained some land from New Brunswick Southwest.

In the 2008 election, the Conservatives gained this seat from the Liberals. The Conservatives were strongest in the rural parts of this riding, outside of Fredericton proper. Within the city, the Liberals still held their own with the NDP capturing a handful of polls, including the University of New Brunswick, and a couple along Parkside Drive.

In the 2019 election, the riding got its first-ever "third party" MP from the Greens. Jenica Atwin won the seat from the former incumbent Liberal MP, Matt DeCourcey, who came third behind the Conservative candidate.

Members of Parliament

This riding has elected the following Members of Parliament:

Election results

Fredericton, 1997-present

2021 general election

2019 general election

2015 general election

2011 general election

2008 general election

2006 general election

2004 general election

2000 general election

1997 general election

Fredericton—York—Sunbury, 1989–1997

Fredericton, 1987–1989

York—Sunbury, 1917–1987

Student Vote results

2011 election
In 2011, a Student Vote was conducted at participating Canadian schools to parallel the 2011 Canadian federal election results. The vote was designed to educate students and simulate the electoral process for persons who have not yet reached the legal majority. Schools with a large student body that reside in another electoral district had the option to vote for candidates outside of the electoral district then where they were physically located.

See also
 List of Canadian federal electoral districts
 Past Canadian electoral districts

References

 Campaign expense data from Elections Canada
 Riding history from the Library of Parliament
York-Sunbury 1917-1987
Fredericton 1987-1989
Fredericton—York—Sunbury 1989-1996
Fredericton 1996-present

Notes

New Brunswick federal electoral districts
Politics of Fredericton